The FA Cup 1972–73 is the 92nd season of the world's oldest football knockout competition; The Football Association Challenge Cup, or FA Cup for short. The large number of clubs entering the tournament from lower down the English football league system meant that the competition started with a number of preliminary and qualifying rounds. The 28 victorious teams from the Fourth Round Qualifying progressed to the First Round Proper.

Preliminary round

Ties

Replays

1st qualifying round

Ties

Replays

2nd replay

3rd replay

2nd qualifying round

Ties

Replays

2nd replays

3rd qualifying round

Ties

Replays

4th qualifying round
The teams that given byes to this round are Telford United, Hillingdon Borough, Skelmersdale United, Dagenham, Barrow, Yeovil Town, South Shields, Chelmsford City, Weymouth, Grantham, Margate, Bangor City, Wigan Athletic, Boston United, Rhyl, Romford, Guildford City, Blyth Spartans, Rossendale United and Crawley Town.

Ties

Replays

1972–73 FA Cup
See 1972-73 FA Cup for details of the rounds from the First Round Proper onwards.

External links
 Football Club History Database: FA Cup 1972–73
 FA Cup Past Results

Qualifying Rounds
FA Cup qualifying rounds